Princess Barabimalabanna (complete title: Her Serene Highness Princess (Mom Chao) Barabimalabanna Voravan ) was a Princess of Thailand, a member of Thai royal family and a member of the Voravan family, a royal house which was originated by her father and descends from Chakri Dynasty and half-sister of Princess Vanbimol Voravan (later to be renamed as Lakshamilavan, Princess consort of King Vajiravudh and Princess Vanvimol Voravan (later Princess Vallabhadevi, formerly fiancée of King Vajiravudh).

References 

1890 births
1981 deaths
Barabimalabanna Voravan
Barabimalabanna Voravan
Barabimalabanna Voravan
Barabimalabanna Voravan
Barabimalabanna Voravan
Barabimalabanna Voravan
Barabimalabanna Voravan
Barabimalabanna Voravan
Barabimalabanna Voravan